Johannes von Leysen (also Leyssen, Laissen, Layß, ; 1310 – 1388) was the first mayor of Allenstein (Polish: Olsztyn), Warmia in Prussia (now in Poland) in 1353.

Leysen originated from a well-known family, recognized in colonizing southern Warmia within the State of the Teutonic Order. His grandfather Martin came to Prussia in 1304 as a free peasant. He was a founder and then Schultheiß of Layß (Łajsy) near Mehlsack (Pieniężno). His father Gerico inherited the position of Schultheiß from his father. Johannes's brother Heinrich von Leysen was the founder of Wartenberg (Wartembork, since 1946 Barczewo) and a village, Skaibotten (Skajboty).

On 13 October 1353, Leysen received a settlement privilege from the Bishopric of Warmia. In 1372 he was promoted to the German nobility, adding the preposition von.

Literature 
 Anton Funk: Geschichte der Stadt Allenstein 1348–1943. Scientia-Verlag, 1979,

External links
http://www.ostpreussen.net/index.php?seite_id=12&kreis=20&stadt=01

1310 births
1388 deaths
German untitled nobility
People from the Kingdom of Prussia
People from the State of the Teutonic Order
People from Olsztyn
 City founders